The Columbia University School of the Arts (also known as School of the Arts or SoA) is the fine arts graduate school of Columbia University in Morningside Heights, New York. It offers Master of Fine Arts (MFA) degrees in Film, Visual Arts, Theatre and Writing, as well as the Master of Arts (MA) degree in Film Studies. It also works closely with the Arts Initiative at Columbia University (CUArts) and organizes the Columbia University Film Festival (CUFF), a week-long program of screenings, screenplay, and teleplay readings.

Founded in 1965, the school is one of the leading institutions for the study of visual and performing arts in the United States. Among the school's distinguished graduates are sculptors David Altmejd and Banks Violette, visual artist Lisi Raskin, painters Marc Handelman and Dana Schutz, screenwriter Jennifer Lee and James Mangold, screenwriter and actress Gülse Birsel and directors Kathryn Bigelow and James Gunn.

History 

The history of the School of Arts can be traced back to the first courses in drawing offered at Columbia in 1881. In 1900, drama critic Brander Matthews was appointed professor of Dramatic Literature, first chair of drama at any university in the country. Courses in creative writing, film, and painting followed. In 1921, the Department of Fine Arts was established for the study of architecture, painting, sculpture and scholarly works in those fields. The university's first sculpture classes were offered in 1936, followed two years later by graphic art classes. In 1947, the School of Painting and Sculpture, and the School of Dramatic Arts were established.

In December 1965, the Trustees of Columbia established the School of the Arts to train both graduate and undergraduate students. In 1970, the school began offering only graduate courses. A year later, it moved into Dodge Hall at Broadway and 116th Street and Prentis Hall on 125th Street, where the school’s classrooms, rehearsal spaces and administrative offices are located. In 1988, the Miller Theatre, constructed in 1924, was established as Columbia's performing arts producer following renovations to the previous space known as the McMillin Academic Theatre. In 2017, construction was completed on Renzo Piano's 60,000-square-foot Lenfest Center for the Arts, a multidisciplinary academic and performance space on Columbia's Manhattanville campus. The Lenfest also houses the Miriam and Ira D. Wallach Art Gallery.

In 2021, the School of Arts was the subject of a Wall Street Journal investigative report into prestigious universities that run programs that have lopsided costs for students relative to their expected earnings in the field. According to the Journal, "Columbia has more high-debt master's degree programs in low-paying fields than any other Ivy League university." The article further stated alumni carry a median debt of $181,000 USD, "the highest debt compared with earnings among graduates of any major university master’s program in the U.S."

Programs

Film 
The School of the Arts's Film Program is well-regarded in the field and offers Master of Fine Arts (MFA) degrees with concentrations in Screenwriting/Directing and Creative Producing. The program also offers a Master of Arts (M.A.) in Film Studies.

In 2016, the MFA film program accepted 72 students out of approximately 600 applicants. The Hollywood Reporter ranked it number four in the top 25 American film schools of 2020.

Theater 
The School of Arts's Theatre Program offers Master of Fine Arts (M.F.A.) degrees in theater with concentrations in acting, directing, playwriting, dramaturgy, stage management, and theater management and producing. The playwriting concentration has been heralded by two-time Pulitzer Prize-winner Lynn Nottage and Tony Award winner David Henry Hwang.

In 2018, applications to the acting concentration doubled with the appointment of former Yale School of Drama acting professor Ron Van Lieu. The acting concentration has emerged as one of the highest ranking graduate acting programs in the world  and is helmed by casting director James Calleri.

The Theatre Program also offers a Ph.D. and joint J.D./M.F.A. degree in association with Columbia Law School.

Visual Arts 
In the Visual Arts Program at the School of Arts, students work in the fields of painting, photography, printmaking, sculpture, digital media, drawing, performance, and video art.

Writing 
The School of Arts's writing program offers degrees in creative writing, with concentrations in fiction, non-fiction, and poetry. One of its more notable features are "master classes," four-week courses for writers (as opposed to critical scholars) "designed to stimulate provocative discussions about literary craft and artistic choices." Master class faculty have included Helen Vendler, Jonathan Lethem, Colson Whitehead, James Wood, Richard Ford, Han Ong, Susan Choi, and Jonathan Ames. The writing division also employs prestigious writers as seminar and workshop instructors; in recent years these have included Zadie Smith, Gary Shteyngart, Nathan Englander, Myla Goldberg, Adam Haslett, Jessica Hagedorn, Phillip Lopate, Marie Howe, Eamon Grennan, Paul LaFarge, David Gates, Francisco Goldman, Darcy Frey, and David Ebershoff.

Deans of Columbia School of the Arts 

 Davidson Taylor (1966–1971)
 Frank MacShane (interim dean, 1971–1972)
 Bernard Beckerman (1972–1976)
 Schuyler G. Chapin (1976–1987)
 Peter Smith (1987–1995)
 Robert Fitzpatrick (1995–1998)
 Dan Kleinman (acting, 1998–1999)
 Bruce W. Ferguson (1999–2005)
 Dan Kleinman (acting, 2005–2007)
 Carol Becker (2007 to present)

Notable alumni and attendees

Film 

Ayad Akhtar - screenwriter and actor, The War Within; Pulitzer Prize-winning playwright, Disgraced
Alice Arlen - screenwriter of Silkwood, The Weight of Water, Then She Found Me
Bogdan Apetri (2006) - screenwriter, film director
Sophie Barthes - screenwriter, film director
Albert Berger - Producer Little Children, Little Miss Sunshine, Cold Mountain
Shari Springer Berman and Robert Pulcini - Academy Award nominated screenwriter-directors, American Splendor, The Nanny Diaries
Kathryn Bigelow (1979) - screenwriter, film director, producer and two time Academy Award winner for The Hurt Locker (2009).
Anna Boden - co-screenwriter and director, Half Nelson, Captain Marvel
Richard Brick (1971) - producer Hangin' with the Homeboys, Caught; Co-Producer Deconstructing Harry, Celebrity, Sweet and Lowdown, Arizona Dream
Liz Chae - screenwriter, film director, documentary director, The Last Mermaids (documentary)
Lisa Cholodenko (1998) - screenwriter and film director, The Kids Are All Right, Laurel Canyon, The L Word
Deborah Chow (2003) - screenwriter, television and film director, The High Cost of Living; director, The Mandalorian
Richard Corliss - Time magazine film critic 
Cherien Dabis (2004) - filmmaker, screenwriter - The L Word, Amreeka
Sabrina Dhawan - screenwriter, Monsoon Wedding
Scott Ferguson (1990) - executive producer, Succession
Michael France - screenwriter, Goldeneye, Cliffhanger
James Franco (2010) - filmmaker, actor, screenwriter, producer
Nicole Holofcener - film and TV director, screenwriter Please Give, Enough Said, Friends With Money, Sex and the City, Gilmore Girls, Six Feet Under
Courtney Hunt - Academy Award nominated screenwriter and film director, Frozen River, The Whole Truth
Phil Johnston - screenwriter, Wreck-It Ralph, Zootopia; co-director, Ralph Breaks the Internet
Khary Jones - Award-winning screenwriter and film director, Hug
Simon Kinberg - screenwriter Mr. & Mrs. Smith, X-Men: First Class, X-Men: Days of Future Past
Yves Lavandier (1983–85) - screenwriter, director and script doctor
Jennifer Lee (2005) - Academy Award-winning screenwriter and director, Frozen, Wreck-It Ralph
 Ashley Lyle - co-creator, Yellowjackets
John Magary - film director, screenwriter The Mend (film)
SJ Main Muñoz (2004) - screenwriter and film director, Requiescat;director, American Horror Stories, Manifest, The Cleaning Lady
James Mangold - film director, screenwriter 3:10 to Yuma, Girl, Interrupted, Walk the Line, Cop Land
Nathalie Álvarez Mesén (2019) - Guldbagge Award-winning director, Clara Sola
Marc Moss (1983-1985) - screenwriter "Kiss The Girls", "Along Came a Spider", "Alex Cross", "Homefront"
Greg Mottola (1991) - film director, screenwriter Adventureland, Superbad, Paul
Mauro Mueller (2008) - film director, producer, screenwriter Copenhagen, A World for Raúl, Dear Chickens
Ron Nyswaner (1981) - screenwriter, The Painted Veil
David Pastor (2004) - screenwriter, film director, Carriers
Kimberly Peirce (1996) - director, Boys Don't Cry, Stop-Loss
James Ponsoldt - writer and director of The End of the Tour, The Spectacular Now, and Smashed
Mark Raso (2008) - screenwriter, film director, Copenhagen, Kodachrome, Awake
Patricia Riggen (2003) - screenwriter, film director, The 33, Girl in Progress, Miracles from Heaven
Jay Russell (1985) - screenwriter, director, producer My Dog Skip, Ladder 49, Tuck Everlasting
Saim Sadiq (1999) - director, Joyland
Beth Schacter (2004) - screenwriter, film director, Normal Adolescent Behavior, Forget Me Nots
Florin Serban (2008) - screenwriter, film director, If I Want to Whistle I Whistle (winner of the Jury Grand Prix & Alfred Bauer Prize at the Berlin Film Festival)
Jeffrey Sharp - producer, You Can Count on Me, Boys Don't Cry, Proof
Patrick Stettner (1995) - screenwriter, film director, The Business of Strangers
Malia Scotch Marmo - screenwriter, Once Around, Hook, Madeline
Joan Stein (1999) - screenwriter, film director, One Day Crossing (winner of the Student Academy Award)
Chris Teague (2006) - cinematographer, Man, The Second Line, Salt Kiss
Eric Tuchman (1987) - executive producer, The Handmaid's Tale
Sergio Umansky (2004) - screenwriter, film director, Here Was The Anthem
Tanya Wexler - film director, Jolt, Hysteria, Finding North
Armond White - film critic
Aaron Woolfolk (1998) - film director, screenwriter The Harimaya Bridge
Lauren Wolkstein (2009) - film director, screenwriter
Alex Zamm (1989) - film director, Beverly Hills Chihuahua 2, Inspector Gadget 2
Sameh Zoabi (2005) - screenwriter, film director, Man without a Cell Phone
Nader Talebzadeh - film director

Theatre 
Ito Aghayere (2012) - actor on Carol's Second Act on CBS
Rachel Chavkin (2008) - theatre director, 2019 Tony Award Winner for Best Direction of a Musical 
Bathsheba Doran (2003) - playwright
Albert Hall (1971) - actor
Claire Labine - head writer of Ryan's Hope, One Life to Live, General Hospital, Where The Heart Is, Guiding Light
Nick Mangano - stage actor and director
Anson Mount (1998) - actor
Diane Paulus (1997) - theater director
James Rebhorn (1972) - actor
Jay Scheib (1997) - theatre director
Kathryn Shaw - director, actor, writer
Marcel Spears (2015) - actor on The Neighborhood on CBS
Darko Tresnjak (1998) - director and winner of a Tony Award, Obie Award, Drama Desk Award, and Outer Critics Circle Award
Beau Willimon (2003) - playwright, screenwriter, producer, creator, showrunner and executive producer of House of Cards

Writing 

Jonathan Ames (1989) - writer
Jesse Ball (2004) - writer
Mary Jo Bang (1998) - poet
Mei-mei Berssenbrugge (1974) - poet
John Bowe (1994) - journalist focussing on modern slavery
Tina Chang (1998) - poet, named Poet Laureate of Brooklyn
Richard Corliss (1974) - film critic
Adam Cushman (2005) - writer, author of Cut
Kiran Desai (1999) - winner of the Booker Prize and the National Book Critics Circle Award for her novel The Inheritance of Loss
Meghan Daum (1996) - writer and journalist
Stephen J. Dubner (1990) - writer, Freakonomics
Peter Farrelly (1986) - director, Green Book; novelist, Outside Providence
Emily Fragos (1996) - poet, nominated for the National Book Critics Circle Award
James Franco (2010) - actor
Matt Gallagher (2013) - writer
Rivka Galchen (2006) - fiction writer, author of Atmospheric Disturbances
Philip Gourevitch (1992) - writer and journalist
James Gunn (1995) - director, Guardians of the Galaxy film series
Tama Janowitz (1986) - writer
Maureen Johnson (2003) - novelist
Heidi Julavits - writer
Dave King (1999) - novelist
Peter Knobler - writer, editor
Benjamin Kunkel - author of Indecision
Jean Kwok - novelist
Clive Matson (1989) - poet, author of nine collections of poetry including Squish Boots and Chalcedony's Ten SongsAlec Michod (1999) - novelist
Dinaw Mengestu (2005) - fiction writer, novelist, author of The Beautiful Things That Heaven BearsSusan Minot (1983) - novelist and screenwriter
Rick Moody (1986) - novelist
Ed Park - novelist and founding editor of The BelieverSigrid Nunez - fiction writer, novelist, author of The Last of Her Kind, Salvation City and Sempre Susan: A Memoir of Susan SontagGregory Orr - poet, author of over 10 collections of poetry including River Inside the RiverKatha Pollitt (1975) - feminist writer
Richard Price (1976) - novelist and screenwriter
Beth Raymer (2007) - fiction writer, non-fiction writer author of Lay the Favorite: A Memoir of Gambling (turning into the film Lay the Favorite) and novel, 'Sweetheart Deals
Karen Russell (2006) - fiction writer, author of Swamplandia!
Anna Rabinowitz (1990) - poet, librettist
Tracy K. Smith (1997) - poet, won the Pulitzer Prize for her book of poetry Life On Mars
 Matthew Stadler (1987) - novelist and essayist, author of Allan Stein
Wells Tower (2000) - fiction and non-fiction writer, author of Everything Ravaged, Everything Burned
Vendela Vida - novelist and founding editor of The Believer
Adam Wilson (2009) - novelist and fiction writer, author of Flatscreen

Visual Arts 
David Altmejd - artist of sculptural systems
Einat Amir (2009) - video and performance artist
Korakrit Arunanondchai (2012) - video and multimedia artist
Chitra Ganesh - visual artist
Samara Golden (2009) - installation artist
Marc Handelman - painter
Louise E. Jefferson - artist, graphic designer
Liz Magic Laser (2008) - visual and performing artist.
Leigh Ledare - photography
Yasue Maetake - sculptor
Sondra Perry (2015) - interdisciplinary; video, computer-based media, and performance
Aki Sasamoto
Lisi Raskin (2003) - visual artist
Edda Renouf (1971), artist and printmaker 
Rachel Rose (2013) - video artist
Mika Rottenberg - video artist
Dana Schutz (2002) - painter
Banks Violette (2000) - sculptor
Jane Zweibel (1984) - painter and art therapist

Music 
Laurie Anderson (1972) - musician
Kenneth Ascher, DMA (1966 CC; 1968 GSAS; 1971 SOA) – jazz pianist, composer
Tan Dun (1993) - composer
Robin Pecknold - frontman of the band Fleet Foxes

Notable faculty 

Leslie Ayvazian - playwright and actor
Ramin Bahrani - film director
Tina Benko - actor
Andy Bienen - screenwriter Boys Don't Cry
Anthony Bregman - producer Eternal Sunshine of the Spotless Mind, Friends With Money
Sanford Biggers - artist
Anne Bogart - theater director
Deborah Brevoort - playwright, librettist and lyricist
Richard Brick- Co-Producer Sweet and Lowdown, Celebrity, Deconstructing Harry; Producer Hangin' with the Homeboys, "Caught"
Matthew Buckingham - artist
James Calleri - casting director
Chou Wen-chung - composer
Barbara De Fina- producer Goodfellas, You Can Count on Me, Kundun, The Grifters
Ira Deutchman- producer "Kiss Me, Guido", "All I Wanna Do", "Way Past Cool"
Rineke Dijkstra - artist
Katherine Dieckmann - film director, screenwriter
Mark Dion - artist
Trey Ellis - screenwriter, filmmaker, novelist
Annette Insdorf - film historian
Kristin Linklater - renowned vocal instructor
Manoel Felciano - Tony Award-nominated actor
Miloš Forman- film director
Liam Gillick - artist
Bette Gordon - film director
Michael Hausman - producer Brokeback Mountain, Gangs of New York, The Firm, All the King's Men
Richard Howard - Pulitzer Prize winning poet
David Henry Hwang - Tony Award winning playwright, librettist and screenwriter
Jamal Joseph - screenwriter, film director
Tom Kalin - screenwriter, film director, and producer
Jon Kessler - artist
David Klass - screenwriter, novelist
Binnie Kirshenbaum - author
Ben Marcus - fiction writer
Charles L. Mee - playwright
Eric Mendelsohn - screenwriter, film director
Gregory Mosher - Tony Award-winning theatrical producer
Mira Nair - director of Monsoon Wedding, Mississippi Masala, and Vanity Fair
Lynn Nottage - two-time winner of the Pulitzer Prize for drama
Richard Peña - film historian and programmer
Adrienne Rich - poet
Matthew Ritchie - artist
Thomas Roma - artist
James Schamus- producer The Ice Storm, Brokeback Mountain, Hulk
Dana Schutz - artist
Andrei Şerban - theater director
Shelly Silver - artist
Peter Sollett- director, screenwriter Raising Victor Vargas, Nick and Norah's Infinite Playlist
Sarah Sze - artist
Rirkrit Tiravanija - artist
Ron Van Lieu - acting teacher
Tomas Vu - artist
Kara Walker - artist
Harris Yulin - actor

See also 
Columbia University

References

External links 

School of the Arts Film Program homepage
School of the Arts Theatre Arts Program homepage
School of the Arts Visual Arts Program homepage
School of the Arts Writing Program homepage
Columbia University Film Festival
Our Word: Writers of Color at Columbia University School of the Arts
Columbia: A Journal of Literature and Art

Art schools in New York City
Culture of New York City
Columbia University
Film schools in New York (state)
Drama schools in the United States
Educational institutions established in 1965
1965 establishments in New York City
Theatre in New York City